Zeki Rıza Sporel (28 February 1898 – 3 November 1969) was a Turkish football player and a politician. He plied his trade at the striker position for Fenerbahçe and the Turkey national football team. His career started in the Fenerbahçe youth teams until he was promoted to the senior team. Zeki spent his entire career with the club, setting numerous records. He was also a forerunner for Turkey, becoming the first player to score for the team. He is often cited as one of the best strikers in Turkish football history. He was also active in politics as he became a member of the Democrat Party in 1946.

Zeki Rıza was the younger brother of Hasan Kamil Sporel who both played for and served as president of Fenerbahçe S.K.

Club career
Born in Istanbul in 1898, Zeki's career began in the Fenerbahçe youth system, where he spent three years. He was promoted to the senior squad during the  1915–16 season at the age of eighteen. His left foot was dominant, as he scarcely used his right foot and his head. Zeki set many scoring records at Fenerbahçe , including most goals in a single match, and fastest goal. On 13 February 1931, Zeki scored a record eight goals in a match as Fenerbahçe won 16–0 against Üsküdar Anadolu. His prolific goal-scoring ability led him to be affectionately named Üstad (The Master). The entirety of his career was spent at Fenerbahçe , retiring in 1934 after eighteen years of service. Zeki's final goal record was 470 goals in 352 matches. If you include the goals from the national team, Istanbul Select and other club selects his total would reach to over 800.

International career
A member of the first Turkish national football team, Zeki played and scored in the country's first international match against Romania. He rounded off the performance with a second goal in the other half. Winning sixteen caps, Zeki led the team ten times while scoring 15 goals. He also played for Turkey at the 1924 Summer Olympics and the 1928 Summer Olympics.

Career statistics

International goals

Honours
 Turkish Football Championship (1): 1933
 Istanbul Football League (4): 1920–21, 1922–23, 1929–30, 1932–33
 Istanbul Friday League (2): 1920–21, 1922–23
 Istanbul Shield (1): 1930
 General Harrington Cup (1): 1923

Political career
After retiring from football Sporel joined the Democrat Party. He was also among the directors of the Party newspaper Zafer.

See also
List of one-club men

References

External links

20th-century journalists
1898 births
1969 deaths
Turkish footballers
Turkey international footballers
Fenerbahçe S.K. footballers
Olympic footballers of Turkey
Footballers at the 1924 Summer Olympics
Footballers at the 1928 Summer Olympics
Fenerbahçe S.K. presidents
Association football forwards
Democrat Party (Turkey, 1946–1961) politicians
Turkish newspaper editors